The following is a list of mountains in North Macedonia.

North Macedonia is a predominantly mountainous country. The average elevation of the terrain is 850 meters. Approximately 80% of the country consists of hills and mountains. The mountains are divided into two basic groups: on the one hand in the North-West the Šar Mountains mountain range that continues to the West Vardar/Pelagonia mountain range in the South-West and South (contiguous with the Dinaric ranges). On the other hand, in the South-East the Osogovo-Belasica mountain chain (westernmost section of the Rila-Rhodope Mountains). 
The Šar Mountains and West Vardar/Pelagonia mountain range is a continuation between the Dinaric Alps to the north and Pindus mountain ranges to the south, whereas the Osogovo-Belasica mountain chain is a continuation of the Rila-Rhodopes mountain massif.

Šar mountain range:
 Šar Mountains
 Mount Korab
 Mount Bistra
 Stogovo
 Dešat
 Jablanica
 Galičica

West Vardar/Pelagonia mountain range:
 Baba
 Jakupica
 Nidže
 Kožuf

Osogovo-Belasica mountain range:
 Osogovo
 Belasica
 Vlahina
 Maleševo
 Plačkovica
 Ogražden

The mountains in the Osogovo-Belasica group are older mountains. They are spread across the eastern part of Macedonia. The mountains in the Šar Mountains group are younger mountains, situated in the western and central part of the country. They are divided in 3 subgroups: area around the Vardar river, area around Pelagonia valley and the area in the north-western part of the country.

There are three national parks protected by law in Macedonia: Pelister, Mavrovo and Galichica.

Following is a list of the most important Macedonian mountains:
 Mount Korab (2,764 m)
 Šar Mountains (2,747 m)
 Baba (2,601 m)
 Jakupica (2,540 m)
 Nidže (2,521 m)
 Dešat (2,373 m)
 Galičica (2,288 m)
 Stogovo (2,273 m)
 Jablanica (2,257 m)
 Osogovo (2,252 m)
 Kožuf (2,166 m)
 Bistra (2,163 m)
 Čeloica (2,062 m)
 Belasica (2,029 m)
 Kozjak (1,284 m)
 Plakenska planina
 Konečka planina
 Maleševo
 Plačkovica
 Buševa planina
 Babuna
 Ogražden
 Selečka planina
 Skopska Crna Gora

References

External links
 Summits in North Macedonia
 Pelister
 Macedonian mountains, national parks
 Korab
 Pelister mountain

 
North Macedonia
Mountains
North Macedonia